Clostridiisalibacter is a Gram-positive moderately halophilic strictly anaerobic and motile bacterial genus from the family of Clostridiaceae with on known species (Clostridiisalibacter paucivorans). Clostridiisalibacter paucivorans has been isolated from olive mill wastewater from Marrakesh.

References

Clostridiaceae
Bacteria genera
Monotypic bacteria genera
Taxa described in 2008